Paul Kenyon is a BAFTA-winning journalist and author who has reported from conflict zones around the world for BBC Panorama and has written several books. He made his name confronting criminals in his own prime time TV show on BBC 1.

Early life 
Kenyon grew up in Bury, Lancashire and Penn, Buckinghamshire.  He attended the Royal Grammar School, High Wycombe and then Bury Grammar School where he played 1st XV rugby and captained the athletics team. He studied social science at Nottingham Trent University.

He was raised as a Unitarian, but his family would sometimes attend Quaker meeting houses. 
 
Kenyon was an obsessive follower of The Clash. At a gig in Blackburn he once sang on stage beside Joe Strummer before being dragged away and beaten by security.

Career 
Kenyon was Parliamentary Research Assistant to Lib Dem MP Simon Hughes from 1987 to 1988.

He then worked as a reporter at a succession of Independent Radio Stations; Viking Radio in Hull, Red Rose in Preston, Piccadilly in Manchester, before becoming a producer at BBC Greater London Radio where he was a contemporary of Chris Evans, Danny Baker and Tommy Vance.

After a spell as a political reporter for the BBC at Millbank, Kenyon became BBC South's Political Correspondent in 1993, and their Home Affairs Correspondent in 1994.  It was during that time he became interested in investigative filmmaking and was given his own mini-series called "Open to Question" where he exposed criminals and confronted them on camera.

In 1996 Kenyon became a BBC News correspondent based at TV Centre in Shepherd's Bush, but after a year was offered his own investigative series again, this time on BBC 2, called "Raising the Roof".  It continued for two series, until Kenyon was offered his own prime time series on BBC1 – "Kenyon Confronts" which ran from 2001 to 2003.  The show used secret filming and dramatic confrontations to expose criminals.  Kenyon famously stopped a sham wedding just as the couple were making their vows, and faked his own funeral in Haiti during an investigation into insurance fraud.

Kenyon then moved to BBC Panorama where his work began to encompass human rights, international conflicts and, in particular, Africa. In 2009 he was named Specialist Journalist of the Year by the Royal Television Society for a series of Panorama programmes on the dangerous migration route out of sub-Saharan Africa into Europe.  At the same time he attacked tabloid newspapers for their "willful misreporting" of migration issues.

Kenyon has reported from more than fifty countries. In 2005 he investigated drug cartels in Colombia for the BBC. While he was filming with the elite Jungla anti-narcotics unit of the Colombian police, the Huey helicopter he was flying in came under fire from drug cartels near to Medellin. Kenyon and his crew escaped unhurt. 

That same year, Kenyon carried out a dangerous assignment for the BBC and American television's Frontline World, covertly filming Iran's secret nuclear facilities. He managed to secure footage of the nuclear plant at Natanz and of a refining unit in Tehran before he was intercepted by the Iranian security services and accused of spying. Pressure from the British embassy helped secure his release.

In 2011 he covered the war in Libya, confronting Gaddafi's son, Saadi, about the shooting of unarmed protestors, for which he won "Best Current Affairs Documentary – Middle East" from the Association of International Broadcasters.  Back home, in 2012 Kenyon was awarded a BAFTA for a Panorama exposing the abuse of patients at a care home in Bristol; "Undercover Care: The Abuse Exposed."

In March 2014, Kenyon witnessed Russia's annexation of Crimea, and reported for Panorama from the fighting in Eastern Ukraine.

He was among a small group of journalists at the Belbeck Airbase in Sevastopol as it was surrounded and taken over by Russian troops, and witnessed the first gunshots of the conflict.

In February 2022 he reported from Kyiv during the Russian invasion of Ukraine. Kenyon and his team were the first journalists on the ground at the now infamous Battle of Hostomel Airport on 24 February 2022.

Kenyon and his team (film-maker Nick Sturdee and fixer Taras Shumeyko) witnessed an intense gun battle at Hostomel and were just metres away from a counterattack by a Ukrainian helicopter when they had to run for cover. The airport quickly became the epicentre of fighting in Kyiv and swapped hands several times over the following weeks. Kenyon also reported from the Battle of Mykolayiv in mid-March 2022 for both Panorama and the Sunday Express.

Kenyon's first book, "I am Justice; a journey out of Africa" was published in 2009. The BBC's Fergal Keane described it as "a beautiful book which carries the agony and hope of Africa in every page."  Kenyon was also a contributing author to the 2011 book "Investigative Journalism; Dead or Alive."

His second major work, "Dictatorland: The Men Who Stole Africa", was published in 2018, and was a Financial Times Book of the Year.

His third book, "Children of the Night: the Strange and Epic Story of Modern Romania", was published in 2021. It weaves the story of his wife’s family in Romania into the country’s broader history. Writing in The Critic, Jessica Douglas-Home described it as "an extraordinary book and in some ways a brilliant one."

After making a programme which exposed the abuse of patients in Indian drug trials, Kenyon accepted an invitation to become patron of The Aware Foundation which helps educate underprivileged children in India, a role he shares with John Wright, the former coach of the India national cricket team.

Family 
Kenyon is married to Flavia Kenyon, the first Romanian-speaking Barrister in the UK.

Awards

Bibliography

Books

 I Am Justice: A Journey Out of Africa (Penguin Random House, 2009)
 Dictatorland: The Men Who Stole Africa (Head of Zeus, 2018)
 Children of the Night: The Strange and Epic Story of Modern Romania (Head of Zeus, 2021)

Critical studies and reviews of Kenyon's work

Dictatorland

Children of the Night

References

1966 births
Living people
People educated at the Royal Grammar School, High Wycombe